Agrippina of Mineo, also known as Saint Agrippina (flourished 3rd century, died 262) was venerated as a virgin martyr in the Catholic Church and Orthodox Christianity.

Legend
Her legend states that she was a blonde princess born of a noble Roman family, and that she was martyred during the reign of Roman Emperor Valerian. She was either beheaded or scourged to death.

Her body was said to have been taken to Mineo, Sicily, by three devout Christian women named Bassa, Paula, and Agatonica, their travels aided by angels. Alban Butler says that the reputed acts in the Greek Menaia are quite unreliable and no evidence is forthcoming of any cultus of early date.

Her canonization date was 783 AD.

Veneration
Saint Agrippina is greatly honored in Sicily and, to a lesser degree, in Greece, where it is said that her relics were translated from Sicily to Constantinople. Her tomb became a popular pilgrimage destination, and she was invoked as a patron saint against evil spirits, leprosy, and thunderstorms.

Her feast day is no longer celebrated in the Catholic Church, however it is celebrated in the Orthodox Church on June 23.

There are three Catholic Churches named after Saint Agrippina; the Church of Saint Agrippina is located in Mineo, Saint Agrippina'a parish church located in Rosario (Argentina) and the Chapel of Saint Agrippina di Mineo is located in Boston, Massachusetts. Immigrants from Mineo to the North End of Boston have celebrated their patron saint annually since 1914 during the first week of August.

References

External links
 Santa Agrippina
 

Year of birth unknown
262 deaths
Sicilian saints
3rd-century Roman women
3rd-century Christian saints
Ante-Nicene Christian female saints